The Utah Department of Transportation (UDOT) is an agency of the state government of Utah, United States; it is usually referred to by its initials UDOT (pronounced "you-dot"). The agency is headquartered in the Calvin L. Rampton state office complex in Taylorsville, Utah.

The executive director is Carlos Braceras  with Lisa Wilson and Teri Newell as Deputy Directors. Project priorities are set forth by the independent Utah Transportation Commission, which coordinates directly with the UDOT.

Structure
The department is divided into four geographically defined regions and 10 functional groups: project development; operations; program development; technology and innovation; employee development; communications; policy and legislative services; audit; and finance. While the agency has maintenance stations throughout the state, for organizational purposes they are grouped into four regions. UDOT's strategic goals include preserve infrastructure, optimize mobility, zero fatalities and strengthen the economy.

History
Originally, the State Road Commission of Utah, created on 23 March 1909, was responsible for maintenance, but these duties were rolled into the new Department of Transportation in 1975.

References

External links 

 

State highways in Utah
State departments of transportation of the United States
Transportation